The Philippi station is a historic train station in Philippi, West Virginia, United States.  Built in 1911, the Mission style building is an unusual representative of that style in the state. After passenger service to Philippi ceased in 1956, the building was used by the Baltimore and Ohio Railroad as a workshop. The station was purchased by the city in 1979 and was restored as the Barbour County Historical Museum. It was listed on the National Register of Historic Places in 1986.

References

External links
 Barbour County Historical Museum - official site

Railway stations in the United States opened in 1911
History museums in West Virginia
Mission Revival architecture in West Virginia
Museums in Barbour County, West Virginia
National Register of Historic Places in Barbour County, West Virginia
Railway stations on the National Register of Historic Places in West Virginia
Spanish Revival architecture in West Virginia
Former Baltimore and Ohio Railroad stations
U.S. Route 250
Former railway stations in West Virginia